Mary Marvel is a superheroine originally published by Fawcett Comics and now owned by DC Comics. Created by Otto Binder and Marc Swayze, she first appeared in Captain Marvel Adventures #18  (cover-dated Dec. 1942). The character is a member of the Marvel / Shazam Family of heroes associated with the superhero Shazam / Captain Marvel.

In the traditional Shazam! concept, Mary Marvel is the alter ego of teenager Mary Batson (adopted name Mary Bromfield), twin sister of Captain Marvel's alter-ego, Billy Batson. Like her brother, Mary has been granted the power of the wizard Shazam, and has but to speak the wizard's name to be transformed into the superpowered Mary Marvel. Mary Marvel was one of the first female spin-offs of a major male superhero, and predates the introduction of Superman's female cousin Supergirl (also created by Otto Binder) by more than a decade.

Following DC's licensing of the Marvel Family characters in 1972, Mary Marvel began appearing in DC Comics, co-starring in DC series such as Shazam! (1973–1978) and The Power of Shazam! (1995–1999). Two limited series from 2007 to 2009, Countdown and Final Crisis, feature an evil version of Mary Marvel having acquired powers from first Shazam Family archenemy Black Adam and further from Apokoliptian supervillain god Desaad. In current continuity following DC's 2011 New 52 reboot, Mary Bromfield appears as the eldest of Billy Batson's foster siblings. Mary can share Billy's power by saying "Shazam" to become an adult superhero (Lady Shazam, and later just Shazam) similar to the traditional Mary Marvel (the "Marvel" monikers having been retired with the reboot).

Mary Bromfield and her superhero alter-ego both made their cinematic debut in the DC Extended Universe 2019 film Shazam!, played by Grace Fulton and Michelle Borth, respectively. Fulton returns in the sequel, Shazam! Fury of the Gods.

Publication history

Fawcett Comics

Mary Marvel was introduced into Fawcett Comics' Marvel Family franchise a year after a young male counterpart, Captain Marvel Jr., made his debut. Artist Marc Swayze based Mary Marvel's design and personality upon American actress Judy Garland. Mary was introduced in Captain Marvel Adventures #18 as Mary Bromfield, a girl who discovers she is the long lost sister of Captain Marvel's alter ego Billy Batson.

In Superhero Comics of the Golden Age, Mike Benton writes:

Soon after her introduction, Mary Marvel headlined Wow Comics, and by 1945 had her own Mary Marvel book. She also appeared in The Marvel Family book with Captain Marvel and Captain Marvel Jr. In her solo adventures, Mary soon gained sidekicks in her kindly Uncle Marvel, who was not actually her uncle nor a Marvel, and his similarly nonpowered niece, Freckles Marvel. Uncle Marvel was eventually made the Marvel Family's manager, and also served as Mary's guardian.

Just before the Marvel Family's adventures ceased publication in 1953, Mary Marvel's costume and appearance were altered: the neckline of her blouse was lowered slightly, her hair was shortened, and she now wore yellow slippers instead of the customary Marvel Family yellow boots. After Fawcett canceled their superhero comics line because of a copyright infringement lawsuit with National Comics (later DC Comics), Mary Marvel hosted a puzzle page drawn by C. C. Beck on page 33 of Mysteries of Unexplored World issue 1 (Charlton Comics August 1956). After that, Mary and her teammates went unseen for years.

DC Comics

1973–1985
In 1972, DC Comics licensed the rights to the Marvels, and revived them in a new comic series called Shazam!. Mary, Cap, and Junior appeared in both new stories and reprints of their classic stories. According to Shazam #1 the Sivanas had put the Marvel family into suspended animation for 20 years, along with themselves (by mistake) and much of the supporting cast. The comic book was canceled by 1978, and the Shazam! stories were relegated to the back pages of World's Finest Comics (from 1979 to 1982) and Adventure Comics (from 1982 to 1983). After the 1985 Crisis on Infinite Earths miniseries, Captain Marvel's origin was rebooted in the Shazam: The New Beginning miniseries in 1987. The Marvel Family was written out of the Shazam! mythos, and neither Mary Batson nor Mary Marvel appeared in DC Comics for several years.

1994–1999
Mary Batson was reintroduced in The Power of Shazam! graphic novel by Jerry Ordway in 1994. An ongoing series followed in the next year, and Mary Marvel was introduced into the modern DC Universe with a new origin story in Power of Shazam! #4.

When calling upon her powers, Mary is transformed into an adult resembling her late mother (in the same way that Billy resembles his father when in Marvel form). Mary shares the title of Captain Marvel with her brother. Various characters in the series distinguish the two by gender when addressing them, addressing Mary as "the lady Captain Marvel".

At first, Mary's costume was the same as her original one. However, beginning with Power of Shazam! #28, Mary donned a white costume to distinguish herself from her brother. The color change was retained for most future uses of the character during the next decade.

2000s
After the Power of Shazam! series ended in 1999, Mary's superpowered alter ego was officially rechristened "Mary Marvel."  In 2002 she had lunch with Supergirl in "The Clubhouse of Solitude", in the spoof graphic anthology "Bizarro Comics". Since then, she has guest-starred in both Superman and Supergirl comics. In 2003, Mary became a member of an offshoot of the Justice League known as the Super Buddies in the Formerly Known as the Justice League miniseries, which juxtaposed her Golden Age-era personality with the modern-day world for comic effect.

Mary Marvel appears briefly in several stories relating to DC's 2005–2006 Infinite Crisis crossover. Mary also appeared in DC's weekly limited series 52, with her most substantial appearance being in 52 #16 as the maid of honor at the wedding of Black Adam and Isis, two Shazam!-related characters. She was defeated by Black Adam during World War III (DC Comics) along with the other Marvels.

In 2006, DC began a revamp of the Shazam! mythos with Judd Winick and Howard Porter's Trials of Shazam! limited series. The series began with a preview within the pages of Brave New World #1 in June 2006, in which Mary Batson loses her powers, suffers a three-mile fall, and falls into a coma. This set up Mary's appearances as a main character in Countdown, a weekly DC series which served as the successor to 52. During the course of the series, head writer Paul Dini and his collaborators had Mary acquire the powers of Black Adam, which give her a new look including a form-fitting long-sleeved black uniform and skirt with black lace-up boots. While the series tracked the character's struggle between good and evil, due to manipulation by supervillainesses Eclipso and Granny Goodness (promotional material for the series used the catchphrase "Seduction of the Innocent," a reference to Fredric Wertham's book of the same title), Mary emerged from the series under the influence of Superman villain Darkseid.

This darker Mary Marvel appears in DC's 2008 crossover series Final Crisis, written by Grant Morrison and illustrated by J. G. Jones, as a Female Fury, with another design change (to match the styles of the other Furies) and a fully evil personality due to possession by the New God Desaad. Though defeated by Freddy Freeman/Shazam before the end of the Final Crisis miniseries, the evil Mary appeared again in the "Black Adam and Isis" arc featured in Justice Society of America (vol. 3) #23–25, by the end of which she has lost her powers and returned to being a normal teenage girl.

2010s
In 2011, following its Flashpoint company-wide event, DC  made sweeping continuity changes to some comic book series and minor ones to others, as part of its relaunch event "The New 52". Captain Marvel, now known as Shazam, received a new origin story as part of a Shazam! backup feature by writer Geoff Johns and penciler Gary Frank, published between 2012 and 2013 in the relaunched Justice League comic series. Mary does not feature in the new continuity until Justice League #8 (2012), and is not transformed into a superhero for the first time until Justice League #21 (2013), when Billy directs his powers into her, Freddy, and their foster siblings Darla, Pedro, and Eugene during a fray with Black Adam.

Mary was largely absent from the main DC Universe for several years after Justice League #22 in 2013. Versions of Mary Marvel from alternate earths in the DC Multiverse appeared in events such as The Multiversity in 2014 and Convergence in 2015. In December 2018, Geoff John and artist Dale Eaglesham launched a new Shazam! ongoing comic series, featuring Mary alongside Billy Batson and the rest of the Shazam Family. The first issue of the new volume of Shazam! also featured a manga backup focused on Mary by Geoff Johns and Mayo "SEN" Naito.

Fictional character biography

Original Fawcett origin
Mary Marvel's first appearance in Captain Marvel Adventures #18 also relayed her origin story.

As infants, twins Billy and Mary Batson were nursed by a woman named Sarah Primm. When the Batsons' parents die in a car accident, Primm was required to send both children to an orphanage. However, Primm is determined to at least give one of the children a home, and arranges for Mary to secretly take the place of another baby girl who had suddenly died while under Primm's care. As a result, Billy is sent to an orphanage while his sister is raised by the wealthy Mrs. Bromfield.

Several years later, Billy Batson becomes a teenage radio announcer. While hosting an on-air quizbowl, he receives an urgent letter from Sarah Primm, now on her death bed, requesting his presence. Billy goes to see her during a break, and Primm tells him the secret of his long-lost sister. To help him find Mary, Primm gives Billy a locket broken in half and tells the boy with her last breaths that Mary wears the other half.

After the quizbowl broadcast is over, Billy tells his best friend Freddy Freeman about his sister and the locket. Billy then recalls that one of the quizbowl contestants, a rich girl named Mary Bromfield, wore a broken locket. He and Freddy trail Mary's limousine in their superpowered forms of Captain Marvel and Captain Marvel Jr. and find themselves called into service to save Mary from a gang of kidnappers.

Captain Marvel then learns that Mary's locket matches his own, and that she is indeed Billy's sister. The Marvels reveal their secret identities to Mary, who wonders if, since she is Billy's twin, she could become a Marvel by saying the magic word "Shazam". Billy, however, is assured that "Old Shaz—er—you know who—wouldn’t give his powers to a girl!"

Just then, the kidnappers awaken then bind and gag Billy and Freddy, preventing them from saying their magic words. Mary exclaims that Billy cannot say "Shazam", inadvertently saying the word herself. She is then struck by a magic lightning bolt and transformed into a super-powered version of herself, later christened "Mary Marvel" by her brother. She defeats the thugs by herself, discovering that she is bulletproof and has super strength, and frees Billy and Freddy. Shazam later reveals the goddesses Mary derives her powers from.

Modified DC origin

Mary Marvel's updated DC origin was presented in the Power of Shazam! graphic novel and ongoing series, written by Jerry Ordway.

Prominent archaeologists C.C. and Marilyn Batson are assigned by the Sivana expedition on an excursion to Egypt. They take along their young daughter Mary, but are forced to leave their son Billy in America with C.C.'s half-brother. The elder Batsons are killed by their associate Theo Adam, who then kidnaps Mary. Upon Theo Adam's return to the United States, Adam's sister, a maid named Sarah Primm, takes Mary into her care. Primm arranges for her childless employers, Nick and Nora Bromfield, to illegally adopt Mary. As Mary Bromfield, the young girl grows up living an idyllic life in a wealthy family, but continuously has dreams of another family with a brother she has never seen.

Meanwhile, Billy eventually finding himself on the streets, and is given the power to become Captain Marvel. He learns that Mary is still alive, but after four years of searching, neither he nor his benefactor, the wizard Shazam, can find the girl. The only thing Billy has to remember Mary by is her favorite toy, a "Tawky Tawny" doll, which was shipped to America with the Batsons’ possessions after their murders.

As a young teenager, Mary enters a regional spelling bee held in Fawcett City and emceed by Billy, who works as an on-air reporter for WHIZ radio. After saving Mary from kidnappers twice as Captain Marvel, Billy notices how much Mary Bromfield reminds him of Mary Batson and has an undercover cop named "Muscles" McGinnis retrieve the girl's forged adoption record. Learning that Mary is indeed his sister, Billy tries to figure out a way to let Mary know he is her brother. The old "Tawky Tawny" doll suddenly transforms into a full-sized humanoid tiger and comes to life, instructing Billy to take it to Mary. As Captain Marvel, Billy flies out to the Bromfields’ hometown of Fairfield to deliver the doll and the adoption papers to Mary.

Captain Marvel arrives at the Bromfield estate and changes back to Billy Batson to deliver the package, but is immediately kidnapped by the thugs who helped Primm forge Mary's adoption records. Mary, not having seen Billy, takes the package and opens it, discovering the adoption records and the Tawky Tawny doll. Once again, the doll comes to life and instructs the bewildered girl to say the magic word "Shazam" and save her brother. Mary complies and is transformed by a bolt of magic lightning into a superpowered doppelganger of her deceased mother. She saves Billy, who transforms into Captain Marvel to help Mary defeat the thugs, but the two Marvels cannot save Sarah Primm, who is murdered by one of the thugs.

The Trials of Shazam! and Countdown

In the eleven page preview to Judd Winick and Howard Porter's Trials of Shazam limited series appearing in DC's Brave New World one-shot comic (June 2006), Mary Marvel loses her powers in mid-flight as an after-effect of the death of the wizard Shazam by the Spectre in Day of Vengeance #6, and falls from a height of three miles. Mary survives the fall but goes into a coma, and Freddy Freeman, who lost the power to become Captain Marvel Jr. in the same way, has her transported to a hospital in New York City where he can keep watch over her. He spends all his money to help her.

In Countdown #51, Mary is released from the hospital. She finds that she is still powerless and a note left by Freddy Freeman with a nurse asks her not to look for him as he is trying to get the powers of Shazam back, per the orders of Marvel. Making her way to Gotham City (despite being warned by Madame Xanadu to avoid the place in Countdown #50), Mary stumbles upon the former Kahndaqi embassy while being chased by violent criminals from the subway, who are killed by Black Adam. Black Adam angrily threatens her. Mary tells Adam how much she valued her powers and how she desires to regain them. Adam, bitter over the loss of his wife Isis and brother-in-law Osiris during the events of 52 as well as his failure to resurrect the former, gives Mary his powers instead of killing her.  He is transformed into the mortal Teth-Adam, whom Mary rescues from a wall toppling on him. Mary wears a black form-fitting costume and wields Adam's powers as a darker, angrier character. While searching for a tutor to help her harness her power at the reformed Riddler's advice, she encounters Klarion the Witch boy in a market for dark magic, who tries to take her power, then Zatanna, who banishes her from her home after a fight, and then Eclipso, who only fuels her wild abandon. She uses a rougher justice, such as turning soldiers to stone and shrinking poachers so their quarries chase them.

Their alliance, however, seems to break down when Eclipso, hoping to please her master Darkseid, offers Mary as his new concubine, reasoning that the two women could always leech Darkseid's arcane knowledge, slay him, and take his place. Mary refuses to sell herself for more power, beats Eclipso with her own crystal, and flees, enraged. Eclipso catches up to her and regains the diamond. Eclipso then departs, leaving Mary alone again. Some time later, Eclipso returns hoping to finish her off, but Mary is too strong for her.

Mary experiences a change of mind, and upon realizing that Black Adam's powers are as responsible for her corruption as Eclipso, divests herself of them by feeding the lightning bolt into Eclipso, who tries to kill her and take her power. Both women lose their powers and fall into the ocean. However, an unpowered Mary lands on Themysciran soil, where Queen Hippolyta drafts her in the rebellion against Granny Goodness, who is posing as the goddess Athena.

Mary, Holly Robinson, and Harleen Quinzel manage to reveal Goodness' deception, and the trio follow her to Apokolips. After escaping the Female Furies, Mary starts to hear the voices of the gods. The group manages to free the Olympian gods from an Apokoliptan chamber, and Mary Marvel's powers are restored along with her white costume, which now has a gray lightning bolt and long sleeves.

After journeying with the Challengers to Earth-51 and witnessing the Great Disaster occurring there, Mary finally returns home to find Darkseid waiting for her. Reminding her of how strong she felt using Black Adam's powers, and claiming the gods do not trust her as much now, he returns them to her, restoring her black costume. She then confronts Donna Troy, Kyle Rayner, Forager, and Jimmy Olsen, seizing Jimmy to take him back to Darkseid. When Donna questions Mary's use of the powers, Mary insists that she is not evil, merely "driven". After Darkseid's defeat, Mary returns to Black Adam, asking to be a part of a new Black Marvel Family. Adam refuses her and, after a big tantrum, she decides to become a solo superheroine.

Final Crisis

Mary returns in Final Crisis, still apparently in Darkseid's thrall, wearing a new black costume with more of a punk look. She attacks Wonder Woman, scratching the Amazon's upper arm and infecting her with an unknown virus delivered from a broken glass vial bearing a gold Omega symbol. Later, when the heroes of Earth attack Blüdhaven, Black Adam notes that she's been possessed by one of the New Gods, a "leering old man". The possessed Mary claims to have a new dirty magic word, a blasphemous name of power, and to have new gods. During a heated battle with Supergirl, Black Adam learns that the evil god Desaad was the one who possessed Mary. Black Adam tries to kill her but is stopped by Freddy. Later, distracted by hordes of Anti-Life followers about to attack, Freddy Freeman, the new Captain Marvel, grabs Mary and uses the last of his magic to transform them back to normal. Though horrified by her actions while possessed by Desaad, and saying, while crying, that she never meant for this to happen, she is seen standing with Freddy with clubs in their hands, awaiting the end of the world.

Justice Society of America
After the end of the Crisis, Mary is recruited by Black Adam and Isis, who have taken over the Rock of Eternity from its former caretaker the wizard Shazam by defeating Captain Marvel and stealing his powers, using the magic scarab Shazam used to take Black Adam's powers. During a battle between Black Adam, Isis, and the Justice Society, who had been summoned by Billy, the evil Mary Marvel abducts a powerless Billy Batson and forces him to become a teenage Black Marvel by sharing her powers and forcing him to say "Mary Marvel".

The two now evil Black Marvels join Adam and Isis, who are intent on using the power of Shazam to destroy the modern world, in fighting the Justice Society. When Isis begins attacking the citizens of Adam's native Khandaq and Adam's friend Atom Smasher, he switches loyalties and joins the Justice Society's Flash and the spirit of Mary and Billy's father in helping resurrect the wizard Shazam from the Rock of Finality, where he has been sealed in stone. Black Adam gives up his powers to restore the wizard to life. Shazam promptly and angrily takes his powers back from Mary, Billy, and Isis, turns Teth Adam and Isis to stone, and closes off all contact to the Rock of Eternity to the Batson kids upon stating that Billy and Mary failed him. He also threatens to go after Freddy for stealing his name. The two Batsons are later seen wandering the streets of Fawcett City, homeless, and wondering what happened to their father's spirit.

Mary and Billy are briefly seen during the events of Blackest Night, now living in an apartment in Fawcett City. While watching news reports of the various heroes and villains being reanimated as Black Lanterns on their laptop, Mary remarks how scary it is to not have her powers anymore.

Mary is approached by Blaze, who offers to restore her and Billy's powers in exchange for her killing Freddy. Mary seems to go along with the deal, appearing to poison Freddy. However, when Blaze arrives to claim Freddy's powers, he gets up and attacks her. With a little help from Mary and Billy, Freddy defeats Blaze and sends her back to hell, later promising them that he will find a way to restore their lost powers.

The New 52/DC Rebirth

The DC Universe was rebooted in 2011 with the New 52 line of comics. In the current continuity, Mary appears as Mary Bromfield, making her debut in Justice League (vol. 2) #8 in 2012. She is the oldest kid living in the Vázquezes' foster home, along with Billy Batson, Freddy Freeman, Eugene Choi, Darla Dudley, and Pedro Peña.

Mary was the second child placed with the Vázquezes, having run away from an abusive home at a young age. Polite and well-mannered, Mary functions as the unofficial "den mother", looking after her foster siblings. When Billy arrives at the Vázquez home and gains the power to become Shazam, he shares his powers with his foster siblings. By saying the magic word "Shazam!" Mary can become an adult superhero with a red uniform similar to that of the traditional Mary Marvel.

Powers and abilities
As Billy's twin, Mary shared Billy's ability to transform into a superhero by speaking the name of the wizard Shazam. In her petite superpowered state, Mary Marvel originally wore a red short-sleeved blouse and red skirt lined with gold trim, which included a lightning bolt insignia and cape.

The Fawcett and pre-1985 version of Mary Marvel did not derive her "Shazam" powers from the male mythological figures who empower Billy, but from a set of female benefactors: Selene for grace,  Hippolyta* for strength, Ariadne (later changed to Artemis, Greek goddess of the hunt) for skill, Zephyrus for fleetness (and flight), Aurora (later changed to Greek goddess Aphrodite) for beauty and Minerva for wisdom.

Although these deities were originally described and depicted as goddesses, Zephyrus is actually a male god. In addition, the list does not account for all of the superhuman traits shared by Billy and Mary, specifically Captain Marvel's powers of invulnerability, stamina, and courage. The original Mary Marvel remained a teenager when she transformed rather than becoming a mature adult like Billy.

A version of Mary Marvel, originating in The Power of Shazam!, has the same powers from the same benefactors as her brother (Solomon, Hercules*, Atlas, Zeus, Achilles and Mercury). A power-sharing element was added to the mythos in the Power of Shazam! series; one finite source of power was shared between Mary, Captain Marvel, and Captain Marvel Jr. This power-sharing element has not been honored by all later appearances of the Marvels. Mary loses these powers in the 2006 Brave New World one-shot special. In early stories, if she had lost her memory or been transformed, her transformation would restore her.

In Countdown to Final Crisis (2007–2008), Black Adam gives Mary his powers. Since Adam was not sharing his powers with anyone else when he granted them to Mary, and had also been carrying the powers of his dead wife Isis (who had granted them to him with her death), Mary is now more powerful than she has ever been. Mary's patron deities become seven Egyptian gods: Shu, Heru, Amon, Zehuti, Aten, Mehen, and the "most powerful" Egyptian deity, Isis, which increases her other powers and allows her to perform magical feats like weather control and transforming others. Mary's powers continue to expand rapidly as she and her mentor Eclipso seek new sources of magical power for her, gaining various new magical powers. She became sufficiently powerful to withstand Darkseid's Omega Beams. Eventually realizing she had been corrupted by Eclipso and the powers of Adam's gods, Mary relinquished these abilities. Mary's powers were restored when she aided the Olympian Gods in retaining their freedom from Apokolips. Later, her Black Adam powers were restored, given to her by Darkseid.

In the later Final Crisis miniseries (2008–2009), Mary's body was further enhanced with genetic technology stolen by the Atomic Knights. In addition to her impressive magical powers, her empowered form is now "aged" from late adolescence to adulthood, with clawed hands able to slice through metal. Later Black Adam restores her powers from the Egyptian gods. She is able to bestow part of it upon Billy, making him Black Billy.

Power of Shazam: Formerly, to change form, Mary had to call upon the name of Shazam, thereby invoking spells involving the energies of those extradimensional beings once known as gods on Earth. When Mary Batson said the magic word "Shazam!", she would be transformed into Mary Marvel. In her Mary Marvel form, Mary possessed the following attributes:

Reception
Mary Marvel has been analyzed as a portrayal of women in American comics, specifically how her physique and costumes serve as examples of masculinity vs. femininity and the objectification of women in comics.

Other versions

52
In the final issue of 52, a new Multiverse is revealed consisting of 52 identical realities.  Earth-5 is depicted as home to the Marvel family characters. As a result of Mister Mind "eating" aspects of this universe, it takes on aspects similar to the pre-Crisis Earth-S. Although the characters are not named in the panel in which they appear, a character looking like Mary Marvel is shown. 52 co-author Grant Morrison has made clear that this alternate universe is not the pre-Crisis Earth-S.

An evil version of Mary Marvel exists in an alternate universe as a member of the "Power Posse" (evil analogues of the Super Buddies). Mistress Mary, as she is called, wears a black variant of Mary's traditional outfit, almost identical to her costume during the  2007/2008 Countdown series.

Shazam! The Monster Society of Evil
In the 2007 limited series Shazam! The Monster Society of Evil, written and illustrated by Jeff Smith, Mary Batson is depicted as a prepubescent child who does not age when she transforms into Mary Marvel.

Mary meets her lost brother in the circus that is attacked by Alligator Men and is rescued by Captain Marvel. With the help of Tawky Tawny, a trickster spirit who changes into various forms but prefers being a tiger when convenient, the siblings learn they are related. When Billy transforms into Captain Marvel, Mary stands too close to her brother and is struck by the fringe of the magic lightning; as a result, Mary gains her Marvel form (which is still at her actual age) that is apparently based on the aspects of various goddesses, including superior flying speed to her brother, and powers stemming by a female set of benefactors. For example, Athena's wisdom is different from Solomon's, allowing Mary to perceive "life vibrations" and distinguish between living and non-living beings.

Although she and Billy are kidnapped in their regular form by Doctor Sivana and Mr. Mind and gagged, Billy escapes and later rescues her as Captain Marvel when she is thrown from the top of a robot by Doctor Sivana; she in turn rescues him from Sivana after, while defeating Mr. Mind, he accidentally loses his powers. Mary subsequently manages to restore his abilities.

Billy Batson and the Magic of Shazam!
Mary appears as a main character in this follow-up series. As in Monster Society of Evil, Mary has only a fraction of her brother's powers and remains a child in super form; although faster, she is far less strong. As Mary is very hyper and reckless, Billy is very protective of her, although he is also often annoyed by her antics and snarkiness. During the final battle against Black Adam, she briefly gains an adult form, only to lose it shortly after and reverting to a child.

Justice League Beyond
In the digital Justice League Beyond comics taking place in the DC Animated Universe's future (based on the Batman Beyond TV series), Mary Marvel, Billy Batson, the wizard Shazam, and Black Adam are somehow sharing the same body. Only one of them can exist in the real world at a time, but can switch places with each other. She appears to be attracted to the Green Lantern of that time period. It is unknown how this occurred.

Tangent Comics
In the Tangent Comics print, Mary was one of three superheroines (the others being Madame Xanadu and Lori Lemaris) who masqueraded as a heroic version of The Joker.

Bombshells
In the DC alternate-WWII universe of the Bombshells, a young Jewish woman named Miriam Bätzel relates traditional Jewish folklore to children hiding from the Nazis to keep their spirits up. Under the stress of their imminent deaths, she starts reciting the names of Jewish heroines: "Shiphrah, Huldah, Abigail, Zipporah, Asenath, Miriam..." In the nick of time, by muttering the acronym "S...H...A...Z...A...M" she is able to tap into mystical energy and become the extremely powerful Shazam, who the children nickname "Miri Marvel." Rather than engage in destructive super-battles, she uses her power to protect and aid the escape of a large group of refugees. Aiding refugees in escaping the war becomes her primary mission in the series.

In other media

Television
 Along with the rest of the Marvel Family, Mary Marvel appeared in The Kid Super Power Hour with Shazam! voiced by Dawn Jeffory.
 Mary Marvel (as Mary Batson) appears in the Batman: The Brave and the Bold episode "The Power of Shazam!" voiced by Tara Strong. As with the origin of her appearance, both Mary and Billy are reunited at the end of the episode after Batman did some detective work that found her. They then confirm their relationship as brother and sister with Mary claiming to be a little older than her twin Billy. through the discovery that they each have possession of half a locket bequeathed to them by their late mother. She returns in "The Malicious Mr. Mind!", this time with the ability to transform into Mary Marvel. She and the other members of the Marvel Family, along with Batman, battle Mr. Mind and his Monster Society of Evil.
 Mary Bromfield appears in the fourth season of Young Justice, voiced by Erika Ishii. She is one of Zatanna's proteges: the Sentinels of Magic. She has given up her superhero identity because the power was going to her head and she couldn't balance her everyday life and superhero life. At the end of "Kaerb Ym Traeh!", she leaves the Sentinels of Magic, and is then tempted by Granny Goodness to return to her old self in a post-credits scene. In the series finale, she becomes a member of the Furies. Mary was a member of the Covert Ops Team in between seasons 1 and 2. She was originally going to appear in season 2 as well as a storyline in the tie-in comic which would have been centered on the Marvel Family, though these plans did not come to fruition.

Film

Animated
 In Justice League: Crisis on Two Earths, an evil version of Mary Marvel appeared on a computer page of the lesser members of the Crime Syndicate. While initially unnamed in the movie, designer Jerome K. Moore identified her as Mary Mayhem. Somewhat confusingly, Superwoman is also identified as being Mary Batson's alter ego.
 Mary Batson appears along with the rest of the Shazam Kids in Justice League: The Flashpoint Paradox.
 Mary Marvel appears in the film Lego DC: Shazam!: Magic and Monsters, voiced by Jennifer Hale.

Live action
 Mary Bromfield appears in the DC Extended Universe film Shazam!, played by Grace Fulton as a teen and Michelle Borth as an adult.  While she is the oldest of the foster children, Mary has been working on plans to enroll in college. After being nearly hit by a truck and saved by Shazam, Mary was showing depression about leaving her foster family behind while Shazam gives her the advice (albeit not in a constructive manner) to do what she needs to do. During Shazam's rescue of a bus, Mary learns that Shazam is Billy Batson as she informs her younger foster brothers Eugene and Pedro. In the climax between Sivana and Shazam, the Wizard's staff is taken by Billy as he shares his powers with his foster siblings. In her superpowered form, Mary helps the foster siblings fight the Seven Deadly Sins while Shazam fights Doctor Sivana. At the end of the film, she and her foster siblings dine in the school cafeteria with Shazam and Superman.
 Grace Fulton reprised her role as Mary Bromfield in Shazam! Fury of the Gods. Fulton also take over the role of adult Mary, with a change of makeup and hair similar to Wonder Woman.In the film, after her brothers drift apart and have personal interests, Mary comforts Billy knowing that he will be leaving the foster system, just like her, and that everyone has to accept their ways and that nothing lasts forever. After Freddy is kidnapped by the Daughters of Atlas, Hespera, Kalypso, and Anthea, Mary and the Shazam Family are locked in a dome along with the city. After saving Freddy, by telling them about Kalypso's plan before the Golden Apple, which has the seed of the Tree of Life, Mary was the last to be taken from her powers by Kalypso, and is saved by Billy being the only one with powers. After monsters attack the town, Mary and the others decide to help Billy by riding unicorns to scare off the monsters. After Kalypso's defeat by Billy, who sacrificed his life, Mary, Anthea, the Wizard Shazam, and the entire family went to Anthea's kingdom at his funeral. Seeing Wonder Woman arrive, who repairs the Wizard's staff and uses it to revive Billy, and happily reunites him with his family, and he uses the staff to restore Mary's powers, as well as her brothers, Anthea and the Wizard.

Web series
 An African-American version of Mary Marvel was set to appear in season 2 of Justice League: Gods and Monsters Chronicles before the project was shelved.
 Mary Marvel makes non-speaking appearances in DC Super Hero Girls.

Video games
 The DCEU version of Mary Bromfield/Mary Marvel appears as a playable character via DLC in Lego DC Super Villains. Like the other members of the Shazam family, she can transform by holding a button, and can fly and shoot electricity.

Miscellaneous
 Although she has not appeared in any other television programs or films, Mary Marvel is featured in issue 20 of the Justice League Unlimited comic book, in which she appears in the art style of the Justice League Unlimited television show.
 She made a cameo appearance in Teen Titans Go! as a member of the Justice League in Beast Boy's fantasy.
 Mary Marvel hosted a puzzle page drawn by C. C. Beck on page 33 of Mysteries of Unexplored World issue 1 (Charlton Comics August 1956)

References

External links
 Mary Marvel's "Who's Who" file at The Marvel Family Web.
 Comprehensive Mary Marvel biography, an in-universe character history at Comicvine.com
 Mary Marvel at Don Markstein's Toonopedia. Archived from the original on February 15, 2016.
 Earth-S Mary Marvel Index
 Earth-S Marvel Family Index
 Captain Marvel Culture.com, the history of the many Captain Marvels
 Counting Down to Countdown V: Mary Marvel, Trickster, Pied Piper – article from Newsarama on Countdown.
Read Mary Marvel #1 

Characters created by Otto Binder
Comics characters introduced in 1942
DC Comics characters who are shapeshifters
DC Comics characters who can move at superhuman speeds
DC Comics characters with accelerated healing
DC Comics characters with superhuman strength
DC Comics characters who can teleport 
DC Comics characters who use magic
DC Comics child superheroes 
DC Comics fantasy characters
DC Comics female superheroes
DC Comics orphans
DC Comics sidekicks
Fictional characters with electric or magnetic abilities
Fictional characters with eidetic memory
Fictional characters with precognition
Fictional characters with dimensional travel abilities
Fictional Republicans (United States)
Twin characters in comics
Golden Age comics titles
Golden Age superheroes
Marvel Family
Superheroes who are adopted
Selene
Ariadne
Artemis
Eos
Minerva
Solomon
Heracles in fiction
Zeus
Achilles
Mercury (mythology)